Hydriomena rixata is a species of moth in the family Geometridae. It was first described in 1875. This species is endemic to New Zealand. The classification of New Zealand endemic moths within the genus Hydriomena is regarded as unsatisfactory and in need of revision. As such this species is currently also known as Hydriomena (s.l.) rixata. The adults of this moth are known to pollinate Dracophyllum acerosum.

References 

Sterrhinae
Moths described in 1875
Moths of New Zealand
Endemic fauna of New Zealand
Taxa named by Rudolf Felder
Taxa named by Alois Friedrich Rogenhofer
Endemic moths of New Zealand